Daniel Gerdes (19 April 1698, Bremen – 11 February 1765) was a German Calvinist theologian and historian. He became professor at the University of Duisburg in 1726, and at the University of Groningen in 1736.

While broadly supporting Protestant freedom of conscience, Gerdes drew a line in his attacks on the Mennonite minister Johannes Stinstra. In that case Gerdes used the views of Samuel Werenfels, tolerant and well thought of by Benjamin Hoadley, to condemn Stinstra.

Works
Historia Reformatis (4 vols., 1744–52)
Scrinium Antiquarium (4 vols., 1749–65)
Specimen Italiae Reformatae (1765)

Notes

External links
WorldCat page
CERL page

1698 births
1765 deaths
German Calvinist and Reformed theologians
18th-century Calvinist and Reformed theologians
Academic staff of the University of Groningen
18th-century German Protestant theologians
German male non-fiction writers
Writers from Bremen
18th-century German male writers